is a Japanese novel written by Shikitei Sanba between 1809 and 1813. It belongs to the kokkeibon genre, of which it is one of the masterpieces.

Contents

Ukiyoburo (Ukiyo Bath) depicts the humor of daily life and culture through the conversations of customers at the public bath. It contains illustrations from Utagawa Kuninao and Kitao Shigemasa (credited as Kitagawa Yoshimaru).

Shikitei notes that his inspiration to base the story at a public bath was due to Santō Kyōden's  (1802) and a rakugo performance by Sanshōtei Karaku.

The text is composed of four parts contained within nine volumes:
Part 1: "Men's Bath", published in 1809
Part 2: "Women's Bath", published in 1810
Part 3: "Omissions from the Women's Bath", published in 1812
Part 4: "Men's Bath Continued", published in 1813
There were advertisements for parts 5, 6, and 7, but they were never written.

Linguistics

Shikitei was particularly careful in noting a number of linguistic characteristics.

In part two, a woman speaking the Kansai dialect and a woman speaking the Tokyo dialect talk.

He also uses the Handakuten mark with the s-character to express [tsa, tse, tso].

Notes

References

External links
Scans of manuscript, Waseda University Library

Kokkeibon
Edo-period works